Argument from inertia or appeal to inertia (sometimes called "Stay the Course") is a logical fallacy derived from the proposition that a mistaken status quo be maintained for its own sake, usually because making a change would require admission of fault in the mistake or because correcting the mistake would require extraordinary effort and resources.

Its name derives from inertia, a concept in physics representing the resistance of any physical object to any change in its velocity.

Similar fallacies
 Where argument from inertia might seek to avoid expending resources and effort on making the necessary change, the sunk-cost fallacy resists change due to that which has already been expended in the past to contribute to the present condition.
 Where existing customs are presented, an argument from inertia can be an appeal to tradition. 
 The argument from inertia counterpoints with the appeal to novelty (argumentum ad novitatem), where the alternative is sought simply on the basis that it is new.

References

Fallacies